Júlia Várady (born 1 September 1941) is a Hungarian-born German soprano who started out as a mezzo-soprano.

Life and career 
Júlia Várady was born Tőzsér Júlia in Nagyvárad, Hungary (today Oradea, Romania). At the age of six she began violin lessons at the Conservatory in Cluj and then, aged fourteen, voice training with Emilia Popp. She later studied voice with Arta Florescu at the Ciprian Porumbescu Conservatory in Bucharest.

She made her debut, as a mezzo-soprano, with the Cluj Opera in 1962, singing in Gluck's Orfeo ed Euridice and as Fiordiligi in Mozart's Così fan tutte.

In 1970, she joined the Frankfurt-am-Main Opera and thereafter sang mostly in Western Europe. In 1973, she moved from Frankfurt to the Bayerische Staatsoper (the Bavarian State Opera) in Munich and later joined the Deutsche Oper Berlin. She has appeared at the Royal Opera House, Covent Garden, London; at the Vienna State Opera; at the Metropolitan Opera in New York; at the Teatro alla Scala in Milan; at the Teatro Colón in Buenos Aires; at the Opéra Bastille in Paris and at the Salzburg, Munich and Edinburgh festivals. In 1978, she created the role of Cordelia at the premiere of Aribert Reimann's opera Lear with the Bayerische Staatsoper.

She was married to the German baritone Dietrich Fischer-Dieskau from 1977 until his death in 2012. In 1998, she retired from opera. She is currently a guest professor at the Hochschule für Musik "Hanns Eisler" in Berlin.

Roles 
Here are most of the roles Julia Varady sang and played in staged opera performances. Roles she sang in the studio (such as the Empress in Strauss' Die Frau ohne Schatten) or in concert (such as Leonore in Beethoven's Fidelio, and Fidelia in Giacomo Puccini's Edgar) are not included.

 Judit in Bartók's Bluebeard's Castle
 Micaëla in Bizet's Carmen
 Konchakovna in Borodin's Prince Igor
 Alceste in Gluck's Alceste
 Orfeo in Gluck's Orfeo ed Euridice
 Marguerite in Charles Gounod's Faust
 Ginevra in Handel's Ariodante
 Santuzza in Mascagni's Cavalleria rusticana
 Elettra in Mozart's Idomeneo
 Susanna, Cherubino and the Countess Rosina in Mozart's The Marriage of Figaro
 Elvira and Anna in Mozart's Don Giovanni
 Fiordiligi in Mozart's Così fan tutte
 Vitellia in Mozart's La clemenza di Tito
 Pamina in Mozart's Die Zauberflöte
 Giulietta and Antonia in Offenbach's Les contes d'Hoffmann
 Cio-Cio-San and Kate Pinkerton in Puccini's Madama Butterfly
 Liù in Puccini's Turandot
 Giorgetta in Puccini's Il tabarro
 Cordelia in Reimann's Lear
 Angelina in Rossini's La Cenerentola Adèle in Rossini's Le Comte Ory Girl in Schönberg's Moses und Aron Saffi in Johann Strauss II's Der Zigeunerbaron Arabella in Richard Strauss' Arabella Composer in R. Strauss' Ariadne auf Naxos Tatiana in Tchaikovsky's Eugene Onegin Lisa in Tchaikovsky's The Queen of Spades Abigaille and Fenena in Verdi's Nabucco Thibault and Élisabeth in Verdi's Don Carlos Desdemona in Verdi's Otello Aida in Verdi's Aida Leonora in Verdi's Il trovatore Leonora in Verdi's La forza del destino Violetta in Verdi's La traviata Amelia in Verdi's Un ballo in maschera Irene in Wagner's Rienzi Senta in Wagner's The Flying Dutchman Eva in Wagner's Die Meistersinger von Nürnberg Freia in Wagner's Das Rheingold Siegrune and Sieglinde in Wagner's Die Walküre Recordings 
 Julia Varady: Song of Passion – DVD (documentary and recordings of live performances) EMI Classics
 Bartok: Bluebird's Castle, with Dietriech Fisher-Dieskau and Wolfgang Sawallisch, conductor - CD, 1979. Deutsche Grammophon
 Richard Strauss: Arias from Salome, Ariadne, Danae, Capriccio – CD. Bamberg Symphony, Fischer-Dieskau, conductor, Orfeo
 Giacomo Puccini: Arias from Madama Butterfly, Tosca, La bohème, La rondine, Gianni Schicchi, Manon Lescaut, Turandot,  Suor Angelica – CD, 1995. Rundfunk-Sinfonieorchester Berlin, Marcello Viotti, conductor, Orfeo
 Pjotr Tchaikowsky: Arias from Eugene Onegin, The Maid of Orleans, Mazeppa, The Sorceress (The Enchantress), The Queen of Spades, Iolanta – CD, 2000. Münchner Rundfunkorchester, Roman Kofman, conductor, Orfeo
 Richard Wagner: Wesendonck Lieder and arias from Tristan und Isolde, Götterdämmerung – CD, 1997. Desutches Symphony Orchestra, Fischer-Dieskau, conductor, Orfeo
 Verdi Heroines: Arias from Nabucco, II Trovatore, La Traviata, Un Ballo In Maschera, La Forza Del Destino – CD, 1995. Munich Bavarian State Orchestra, Fischer-Dieskau, conductor, Orfeo
 J.S. Bach: Coffee Cantata, Peasant Cantata – CD, London 11/1981, Julia Varady (Soprano), et al., with Academy of St. Martin-In-The-Fields, Phillips Digital Classics
 Mozart/Strauss Lieder – CD, Berlin, 1991, with Elena Bashkirova, piano, Orfeo
 Mozart: Don Giovanni, 1987, Karajan, Vienna Philharmonic, DVD, Telemondial/Sony.
 Cecilio in Mozart's Lucio Silla - Leopold Hager conducting the Mozarteumarchester Salzburg, 1975, Deutsche Grammophon
 Giacomo Meyerbeer: Gli amori di Teolinda – CD, Berlin, 1983, RIAS Kammerchor, Radio-Symphonie-Orchester-Berlin, Jörg Fadle Klarinette and Gerd Albrecht conductor, Orfeo

 Sources 
 Rosenthal, H. and Warrack, J. (eds.), "Varady Julia", The Concise Oxford Dictionary of Opera'', 2nd Edition, Oxford University Press, 1979. p. 519

External links 
 Julia Varady section of Julia Varady und Dietrich Fischer-Dieskau website, in German and English
 Short biography of Julia Varady, with some differences from the above

1941 births
Living people
Grammy Award winners
Hungarian expatriates in Germany
Hungarian operatic sopranos
People from Oradea
Academic staff of the Hochschule für Musik Hanns Eisler Berlin
20th-century Hungarian women opera singers